Market Street Halt was a halt that served the town of Kidsgrove, Staffordshire, England. It was opened in 1909 and located on the  Potteries Loop Line. At first it was used by trains in both directions but was later served only by northbound trains due to the severe gradient, being a 1 in 40 climb southbound.

Although only a halt, it had a considerable length of platform and modest wooden buildings, plus an old NSR carriage used as a waiting room.

The halt closed in 1950 and the trackbed is now part of the Potteries Greenway.

References

Disused railway stations in Staffordshire
Railway stations in Great Britain closed in 1950
Railway stations in Great Britain opened in 1909
Former North Staffordshire Railway stations
Kidsgrove